Pamela Bach (born Pamela Ann Weissenbach), also known as Pamela Bach-Hasselhoff, is an American actress.

Early life
Bach is from Tulsa, Oklahoma, the second of three daughters.  Her mother was a model, and she also modeled as a teenager. She attended Tulsa East Central High School and studied engineering/Theatre Arts at Northeastern Oklahoma A&M College.    She moved to Los Angeles in 1985.

Career
Bach is one of the recipients of the annual Bravo Otto award as one of German teens' favourite actresses.  This is an award given by the German teen magazine Bravo. She worked together with her husband on the long-running series Baywatch and she had a recurring role as a psychologist in the series Sirens.  She participated in the 2011 UK reality TV show/competition Celebrity Big Brother 8, which she placed 9th, and was in the house from August 18–31, 2011. She was the second celebrity to be evicted from the house, being evicted on Day 14.

Personal life
Bach met David Hasselhoff on the set of the Knight Rider episode "Knight Racer" in 1985. They married in December 1989, and in January 2006, Hasselhoff announced he was filing for divorce, citing irreconcilable differences. Their divorce was finalized in August 2006. Bach was given custody of one daughter and Hasselhoff custody of the other. Both appeared on the CBS daytime drama The Young and the Restless, though not at the same time: Pamela as Mari Jo Mason #1 in 1994 and David as Dr. Snapper Foster #2 between 1975 and 1982.

Filmography
1983 - Rumble Fish
1985 – Appointment with Fear
 1988 – Nudity Required
 1998 – Route 66
 2000 – Castle Rock
 2002 – More than Puppy Love

Television work
1985 – Otherworld 
1984 – Solid Gold 
1985 – George Burns Comedy Week
1985 – T.J. Hooker
1985 – Knight Rider
1986 – The Fall Guy
1986 – Cheers
1986 – Throb
1988 – Sonny Spoon
1989 – Superboy
1989 – The New Lassie
1991 – Baywatch
1994 – The Young and the Restless
1995 – Sirens
1997 – Baywatch Nights
1998 – Viper
2011 – Celebrity Big Brother 2011

References

External links

Official website

20th-century American actresses
American television actresses
American film actresses
Female models from Oklahoma
Living people
Northeastern Oklahoma A&M College alumni
21st-century American women
Year of birth missing (living people)